Duncan Kasumba Mugabe (born 27 November 1990) is a Ugandan professional tennis player.

Early life
Mugabe was raised in a large family in the Lugogo area of the capital Kampala. He has seven siblings, including national cricketer Danniel Ruyange and basketball player Brian Kasumba. His breakthrough win came in the ITF East Africa under 13s in 2003, after which he received a training placement in South Africa and ultimately a five-year scholarship. During this time he studied at Clapham High School in Pretoria.

Tennis career
Mugabe reached his best singles world ranking of 659 in 2009. The following year he became the first Ugandan player to win the Kenyan Open for 31 years. He represented Uganda at the 2010 Commonwealth Games in Delhi, where he was beaten in the first round of the singles by Aisam-ul-Haq Qureshi. In 2011 he earned a singles bronze medal at the 2011 All-Africa Games. He was a singles quarter-finalist at the 2017 Islamic Solidarity Games.

Controversy
Mugabe has had an at times fractious relationship with the Uganda Tennis Association, which in 2018 banned him for six-months, citing instances of indiscipline.

ITF Futures finals

Singles: 1 (0–1)

Doubles: 8 (4–4)

References

External links
 
 

1990 births
Living people
Ugandan sportsmen
Male tennis players
Sportspeople from Kampala
Competitors at the 2011 All-Africa Games
African Games bronze medalists for Uganda
African Games medalists in tennis
Tennis players at the 2010 Commonwealth Games
Commonwealth Games competitors for Uganda
Islamic Solidarity Games competitors for Uganda